Halawa is a place and valley on the island of Oahu, Hawaii, United States.

Halawa may also refer to
Places
Halawa, Molokai, Hawaii
Halawa Correctional Facility
Halawah, a village in Jordan
 Halawa, a village in Ethiopia
Other
Halva, a sweet confection from the Middle East
USS Halawa (AOG-12), an American gasoline tanker launched in 1929
Hair Removal by Sugaring is also known as ḥalawa.

See also 
Halawa House, a house in Egypt